Myriocladus is a South American genus of bamboo in the grass family. It is found in the sandstone tablelands of Venezuela, Guyana, Suriname, and northern Brazil.

Species

References

Bambusoideae genera
Grasses of South America
Grasses of Brazil
Flora of Guyana
Flora of Suriname
Flora of Venezuela
Bambusoideae